Terry Pearce may refer to:

Trevor Mark "Terry" Pearce (1905–1986), New Zealand Test cricket umpire
Terry Pearce (fl. 1992), futsal coach for Australia at the 1992 Paralympic Games for Persons with Mental Handicap
Terry Pearce (fl. 2015), candidate in the 2015 Bracknell Forest Borough Council election, England
Terry Pearce (fl. 2016), Australian competitor in the M60 2000 metres steeplechase at the 2016 World Masters Athletics Championships
Terry Pearce (fl. 1970s), telescope maker affiliated with the Hampstead Scientific Society

See also
Teresa Pearce (born 1955), British politician
Terry Peirce (1930–1984), Australian rules footballer
Terry Pierce (born 1981), American football linebacker